OpenX may refer to:

 OpenX (company) - OpenX Software Ltd., a SSP advertising company based in Pasadena, California
 OpenX (software) - an open-source ad server software package, previously known as "phpAdsNew" and "OpenAds"
 OpenX (mount), a 3D printer extruder mount